The U.S. Post Office, Courthouse, and Customhouse, also known as Main Post Office, is a historic post office, courthouse, and custom house, located on Rodney Square in Wilmington, New Castle County, Delaware. It was designed by Irwin & Leighton in 1933–1935, and building was completed in 1937.  It is in the Classical Revival.  It is a three-story, cut stone structure with six large stone pillars across the main entrance. the gross building area is 104,669 sq. ft. It now serves as Wilmington Trust headquarters.

It was listed on the National Register of Historic Places in 1979.

See also 

 Old Customshouse (Wilmington, Delaware)
 List of United States federal courthouses in Delaware
 List of United States post offices

References 

Courthouses on the National Register of Historic Places in Delaware
Neoclassical architecture in Delaware
Government buildings completed in 1933
Buildings and structures in New Castle County, Delaware
Wilmington
Custom houses in the United States
National Register of Historic Places in Wilmington, Delaware
Custom houses on the National Register of Historic Places
Government buildings on the National Register of Historic Places in Massachusetts